The 1932 Philadelphia Athletics season involved the A's finishing second in the American League with a record of 94 wins and 60 losses. The team finished 13 games behind the New York Yankees, breaking their streak of three straight AL championships.

Regular season 
Jimmie Foxx had an impressive offensive season – 58 home runs, 169 RBI, and a .364 batting average – and missed the triple crown by just three BA points. He was voted the American League Most Valuable Player. Mickey Cochrane became the first catcher in Major League Baseball history to score 100 runs and have 100 RBI in the same season.

Season standings

Record vs. opponents

Notable transactions 
 September 28, 1932: Al Simmons was purchased from the Athletics by the Chicago White Sox.

Roster

Player stats

Batting

Starters by position 
Note: Pos = Position; G = Games played; AB = At bats; H = Hits; Avg. = Batting average; HR = Home runs; RBI = Runs batted in

Other batters 
Note: G = Games played; AB = At bats; H = Hits; Avg. = Batting average; HR = Home runs; RBI = Runs batted in

Pitching

Starting pitchers 
Note: G = Games pitched; IP = Innings pitched; W = Wins; L = Losses; ERA = Earned run average; SO = Strikeouts

Other pitchers 
Note: G = Games pitched; IP = Innings pitched; W = Wins; L = Losses; ERA = Earned run average; SO = Strikeouts

Relief pitchers 
Note: G = Games pitched; W = Wins; L = Losses; SV = Saves; ERA = Earned run average; SO = Strikeouts

Awards and honors

League top five finishers 
Jimmie Foxx
 AL leader in home runs (58)
 AL leader in RBI (169)
 AL leader in runs scored (151)
 AL leader in slugging percentage (.749)
 #2 in AL in batting average (.364)
 #2 in AL in on-base percentage (.469)

Lefty Grove
 AL leader in ERA (2.84)
 #2 in AL in wins (25)
 #2 in AL in strikeouts (188)

Al Simmons
 #2 in AL in RBI (151)
 #2 in AL in runs scored (144)
 #3 in AL in home runs (35)

Farm system 

LEAGUE CHAMPIONS: Portland

References

External links
1932 Philadelphia Athletics team page at Baseball Reference
1932 Philadelphia Athletics team page at www.baseball-almanac.com

Oakland Athletics seasons
Philadelphia Athletics season
Oakland